An election to the Carmarthen Rural District Council in Wales was held in April 1919. It was preceded by the 1913 election due to the scheduled 1916 election being postponed due to the First World War, and was followed by the 1922 election. Eleven members were returned unopposed and, in addition, the retiring member was returned for Llandawke and Llansadurnen after no nominations were received. The successful candidates were also elected to the Carmarthen Board of Guardians.

Overview of the results
These were the first elections for six years and a number of sitting members were defeated. Labour candidates stood for the first time. In Llanarthney, both were heavily defeated but in Llangendeirne, Richard Williams defeated long-serving member D.T. Gilbert by two votes. In St Ishmaels, Rosina Davies, a prominent figure in the 1904-05 Religious Revival sought election but finished bottom of the poll.

Ward Results

Abergwili (two seats)

Abernant (one seat)

Conwil (two seats)

Laugharne Parish (one seat)

Laugharne Township (one seat)

Llanarthney (two seats)

Llandawke and Llansadurnen (one seat)
No nomination was received therefore the retiring member was returned unopposed.

Llanddarog (one seat)

Llandeilo Abercowyn and Llangynog (one seat)

Llanddowror (one seat)

Llandyfaelog (one seat)

Llanfihangel Abercowin (one seat)

Llangain (one seat)

Llangendeirne (two seats)

Llangunnor (one seat)

Llangynin (one seat)

Llanllawddog (one seat)

Llanpumsaint (one seat)

Llanstephan (one seat)

Llanwinio (one seat)

Merthyr (one seat)

Mydrim (one seat)

Newchurch (one seat)

St Clears (one seat)

St Ishmaels (one seat)

Trelech a'r Betws (two seats)

Carmarthen Board of Guardians

All members of the District Council also served as members of Carmarthen Board of Guardians. In addition six members were elected to represent the borough of Carmarthen. All six sitting members were returned unopposed.

Carmarthen (six seats)

References

1919 Welsh local elections
Elections in Carmarthenshire
20th century in Carmarthenshire